Dr. Carl V. Reynolds House, now known as the Albemarle Inn, is a historic home located at Asheville, Buncombe County, North Carolina. It was built in 1909, and is a three-story, square frame dwelling in the Colonial Revival / Neoclassical style. It features a flat roofed portico with pairs of fluted Corinthian order columns and half-round pilasters. The home was converted into apartments in the 1940s and now houses an inn.

It was listed on the National Register of Historic Places in 1982.

References

External links
Albemarle Inn website

Houses on the National Register of Historic Places in North Carolina
Neoclassical architecture in North Carolina
Colonial Revival architecture in North Carolina
Houses completed in 1909
Houses in Asheville, North Carolina
National Register of Historic Places in Buncombe County, North Carolina